Hugh Molloy (September 25, 1841 – March 8, 1922) was a United States Navy sailor and a recipient of America's highest military decoration—the Medal of Honor—for his actions in the American Civil War.

Biography
He was awarded the Medal of Honor for his actions during an engagement with a Confederate artillery battery near Harrisonburg, Louisiana, on March 2, 1864.

Hugh Molloy died at age 80 and was buried in Calvary Cemetery, Evanston, Illinois.

Medal of Honor citation

Rank and Organization:
Ordinary Seaman, U.S. Navy. Born: 1832, Illinois. Accredited to: Illinois. G.O. No.: 32, April 16, 1864.

Citation:
Served on board the U.S.S. Fort Hindman during the engagement near Harrisonburg, La., 2 March 1864. Following a shellburst which mortally wounded the first sponger, who dropped the sponge out of the forecastle port, Molloy jumped out of the port to the forecastle, recovered the sponge and sponged and loaded the gun for the remainder of the action from his exposed position, despite the extreme danger to his person from the raking fire of enemy musketry.

See also

List of American Civil War Medal of Honor recipients: M–P

Notes

References

1841 births
1922 deaths
19th-century Irish people
Irish sailors in the United States Navy
United States Navy Medal of Honor recipients
Union Navy sailors
Irish-born Medal of Honor recipients
Irish emigrants to the United States (before 1923)
American Civil War recipients of the Medal of Honor
Burials at Calvary Cemetery (Evanston, Illinois)